The 2014 IPSC Handgun World Shoot XVII held at the Universal Shooting Academy in Frostproof, Florida, United States, was the 17th IPSC Handgun World Shoot.

Champions

Open 
The Open division had the second largest match participation with 385 competitors (29.5 %), and was won by Max Michel of USA in front of his American teammate Shane Coley by 0.08 %, and Brodie McIntosh from Australia in third place by another 1.8 %.

Individual

Teams Open

Standard 
The Standard division had the third largest match participation with 374 competitors (28.7 %). Nils Jonasson of USA took the Standard division gold in front of his two American teammates Bob Vogel in second place by 1.34 %, and Dave Sevigny in third place another 0.02 % behind Vogel.

Individual

Teams Standard

Production 
The Production division had the largest match participation with 392 competitors (30.1 %), and was won  by Eric Grauffel from France taking his 7th consecutive Handgun World Shoot gold medal. Simon Racaza representing USA came in second place by 3.32 %, and his American teammate Ben Stoeger can in third place another 0.56 % behind Racaza.

Individual

Teams Production

Classic 
The Classic division had 104 competitors (8.0 %). Senior shooter Rob Leatham of USA, in addition to winning the Senior category, also won the Classic Overall category, and thereby claimed his 6th Handgun World Shoot gold medal. Edward Rivera of the Philippines took second place by 0.28 %, and Todd Jarrett of USA took third place another 0.99 % behind.

Individual

Teams Classic

Revolver 
The Revolver division had 49 competitors (3.8 %) and was won by Ricardo López Tugendhat from Ecuador who took his third consecutive Revolver division World title. Josh Lentz of USA followed in second place by 1.06 %, and Phillipp Chua from the Philippines in third place another 3.43 % behind Lentz.

Individual

Teams Revolver

See also 
IPSC Rifle World Shoots
IPSC Shotgun World Shoot
IPSC Action Air World Shoot

References

IPSC.org :: Match Results (Summary) - 2014 Handgun World Shoot, United States
Official Final Results (Full): 2014 HG World Shoot XVII
worldshootusa.com - Results (pdf) ‹ IPSC WORLD SHOOT XVII – Florida, U.S.A.

2014
IPSC
Shooting competitions in the United States
2014 in American sports
International sports competitions hosted by the United States